Zerfas is the only studio album by the psychedelic rock group Zerfas. It was released in 1973 on 700 West. The album had limited commercial success, but found a much larger audience in the early 2000s when the track "I Need it Higher" was featured on the American edition of the Love, Peace, and Poetry psychedelic music compilations.

The record was given an official deluxe reissue on LP in 1994 using the master tapes as source. 500 copies were pressed, but due to a pressing defect, only 375 were put into circulation. An official CD has never been released, although the album has been bootlegged from vinyl and released on the Radioactive, Phoenix, and Lion labels.

Zerfas' story is told on the 700 West website.

Track listing

Chapter One
"You Never Win" (David Zerfas and Herman Zerfas)
"The Sweetest Part" (David Zerfas and Mark Tribby)
"I Don't Understand" (David Zerfas, Herman Zerfas and John McCormick)
"I Need It Higher" (David Zerfas)

Chapter Two
"Stoney Wellitz" (David Zerfas and Herman Zerfas)
"Hope" (Bill Rice and Herman Zerfas)
"Fool's Parade" (David Zerfas and Herman Zerfas)
"The Piper" (David Zerfas and Steve Newhold)

Personnel
Dave Zerfas – drums, percussion, background vocals, lead vocals, guitar
Herman Zerfas – keyboards, background vocals, guitar, bass, lead vocals
Mark Tribby – bass, guitar, background vocals, lead vocals
Bo Gooliak – bass
Bill Rice – bass, background vocals
Steve Newbold – bass, guitar, background vocals
M. J. Whittemore, Jr. – elks horn

References

Bibliography

External links
Album notes

1973 debut albums
Zerfas (band) albums